Vakula (Cyrillic: Вакула) is a Belarusian and Ukrainian surname. Notable people with the surname include:

 Nineli Vakula (born 1949), Soviet-Belarusian sprint canoer
 Svetlana Vakula (born 1977), Belarusian sprint canoer
 Vladyslav Vakula (born 1999), Ukrainian football player

See also
 

Belarusian-language surnames
Ukrainian-language surnames